Botanical gardens in Romania have collections consisting entirely of Romania native and endemic species; most have a collection that include plants from around the world. There are botanical gardens and arboreta in all states and territories of Romania, most are administered by local governments, some are privately owned.

 Arad Botanical Garden
 Arad Eutopia Gardens
 Bucharest Botanical Garden
 Cluj-Napoca Botanical Garden
 Craiova Botanical Garden
 Galaţi Botanical Garden
 Iași Botanical Garden
 Jibou Botanical Garden
 Târgu-Mureş Botanical Garden
 Therme București
 Timişoara Botanical Garden
 Tulcea Botanical Garden

References 

Romania
Botanical gardens